The 2021–22 UTEP Miners women's basketball team represents the University of Texas at El Paso during the 2021–22 NCAA Division I women's basketball season. The team is led by fifth-year head coach Kevin Baker, and plays their home games at the Don Haskins Center in El Paso, Texas as a member of Conference USA.

Schedule and results

|-
!colspan=12 style=|Exhibition

|-
!colspan=12 style=|Non-conference regular season

|-
!colspan=12 style=|CUSA regular season

|-
!colspan=12 style=| Conference USA Tournament

See also
 2021–22 UTEP Miners men's basketball team

Notes

References

UTEP Miners women's basketball seasons
UTEP Miners
UTEP Miners women's basketball
UTEP Miners women's basketball